That's So Gay is an album by the American queercore band Pansy Division. It was released on March 31, 2009, by Alternative Tentacles.

Critical reception
Exclaim! called the album "the band's most natural commingling of music and message yet ... Equal amounts of attention are paid to crafting sultry, unforgettable tunes as cramming double entendres into every line." Magnet wrote that it "retains the group’s signature melodic songs and humorous, homo-tawdry lyrics." Tucson Weekly wrote that "the joke is obvious but doesn't ever get old, because underneath the cartoonish simplicity, the music is actually, well, fun as hell." The Advocate wrote: "With a sense of humor as sharp-witted as ever, the seminal S.F. queercore combo is still on top of their game, taking on heteronormative hypocrisy in their triumphant return after a six-year hiatus."

Track listing

Personnel
Luis Illades – drums, percussion, keyboards on track 13
Jon Ginoli – guitars, vocals
Joel Reader – lead guitars, vocals
Chris Freeman – bass guitars, vocals, keyboards on tracks 8 and 10
Jello Biafra - guest vocals on track 2

References

2009 albums
Pansy Division albums
Alternative Tentacles albums